Cleveland school shooting may refer to:

 Cleveland Elementary School shooting (San Diego), an incident in 1979, committed by Brenda Spencer
 Cleveland Elementary School shooting (Stockton), an incident in 1989, committed by Patrick Purdy
 Case Western Reserve University shooting, an incident in Cleveland, Ohio, in 2003, committed by Biswanath Halder
 SuccessTech Academy shooting, an incident in Cleveland, Ohio, in 2007, committed by Asa H. Coon

See also
Cleveland shooting (disambiguation)